The 1966–67 NBA season was the Detroit Pistons' 19th season in the NBA and tenth season in the city of Detroit.  The team played at Cobo Arena in Detroit.

The team struggled to a 30-51 (.370) record, 5th in the Western Division.  The team removed the coach role from 26 year-old player-coach Dave DeBusschere as the season was coming to an end, even as DeBusschere led the team (18.2 ppg, 11.8 rpg, NBA All-Star) on the court.  The Pistons added rookie Dave Bing with the 2nd choice in the first round of the 1966 NBA Draft and Bing contributed immediately with 20 ppg, 4.1 apg, was named to the NBA All-Rookie Team and honored as the NBA Rookie of the Year at the start of his Hall of Fame career.

Roster

Regular season

Season standings

x – clinched playoff spot

Record vs. opponents

Game log

Awards and records
Dave Bing, NBA Rookie of the Year Award
Dave Bing, NBA All-Rookie Team 1st Team

References

Detroit Pistons seasons
Detroit
Detroit Pistons
Detroit Pistons